This article shows the Qualifying Draw for the 2011 Rogers Cup.

Players

Seeds

Qualifiers

Lucky losers
  Lu Yen-hsun

Results

First qualifier

Second qualifier

Third qualifier

Fourth qualifier

Fifth qualifier

Sixth qualifier

Seventh qualifier

References
 Qualifying Draw

Rogers Cup - Men's Singles Qualifying
2011 Rogers Cup
Qualification for tennis tournaments